The International Strategic Studies Association (ISSA) describes itself as Washington, D.C.–based non-governmental organization (NGO) with a worldwide membership of professionals involved in national management, particularly in national and international security and strategic policy. The International Strategic Studies Association was formed in 1982 to create a focus for regular discussion on strategic issues, including defense, defense industrial concerns, international technology transfer, geopolitical and psychological strategy developments.

See also
Strategic studies

References

External links
 International Strategic Studies Association website

Organizations based in Washington, D.C.
Peace and conflict studies
Organizations established in 1982
1982 establishments in Washington, D.C.
Non-governmental organizations